The 1992–93 Utah Utes men's basketball team represented the University of Utah as a member of the Western Athletic Conference during the 1992–93 men's basketball season. Led by head coach Rick Majerus, the Utes won the WAC regular season title and received a bid to the NCAA tournament. Participating in the Southeast regional, Utah defeated Pittsburgh in the opening round before falling to No. 1 seed Kentucky in the second round. The Utes finished with an overall record of 24–7 (15–3 WAC).

Roster

Schedule and results

|-
!colspan=9 style= | Non-conference regular season

|-
!colspan=9 style= | WAC Regular Season

|-
!colspan=9 style= | WAC Tournament

|-
!colspan=9 style= | NCAA Tournament

Rankings

Awards and honors
Josh Grant – WAC Player of the Year (2x)

Players in the 1993 NBA draft

References

Utah Utes men's basketball seasons
Utah
Utah
Utah Utes
Utah Utes